John Parsons (1817–1869) was an English Baptist missionary to India and reviser of William Carey's Hindi Bible. He came to India with his wife Jane, whom he married in 1840, to join his brother George and his wife, Sophia at Monghyr. George's health, however, had been poor in the country and he died a week prior to their arrival in November. Sophia Parsons returned, permanently, to England in 1842. Parsons died at Monghyr in 1869.

References

1869 deaths
Translators of the Bible into Hindi
Year of birth unknown
Baptist missionaries in India
English Baptist missionaries
1817 births
19th-century translators
19th-century Baptists
Missionary linguists